WCEH (610 kHz) is an AM radio station licensed to serve Hawkinsville, Georgia. The station is operated by Shanks Broadcasting with a classic rock format.

History
Until 1993, WCEH was simulcast on 610 AM and 103.9 FM. The image slogan was "All The Best, AM 61 and FM 104".  In 1993, WCEH-FM became WQSY-FM, "Sunny 103.9 FM", and its format was changed to adult contemporary.

In 2006, WCEH was one of five stations sold to Georgia Eagle Broadcasting..

In January 2008, WCEH announced that it would switch to carry Fox Sports programming 21 hours a day.

In April 2013, WCEH-AM dropped its sports format and started an oldies format called "Wonderful 61" where they play music from the 50s, 60s, and 70s. It is also simulcast on 98.3 FM on WCEH-FM.

On February 1, 2014 WCEH changed their format to adult standards, with programming from Westwood One's "America's Best Music" format.

On May 5, 2017 after WCEH was sold, WCEH and WCEH-FM started simulcasting The Fox 94.7. The sale of WCEH, WCEH-FM, WDXQ, WWKM, and W244CL by Georgia Eagle Media to John Timms' Central Georgia Radio LLC was consummated on August 3, 2017, at a purchase price of $150,000.

On July 31, 2018 WCEH and WCEH-FM started simulcasting ESPN Radio.

In October 2019, WCEH split from its simulcast with WCEH-FM and changed their format from sports to classic rock, branded as "Highway 96" (simulcast on FM translator W241CO 96.1 FM Hawkinsville).

References

External links

CEH (AM)
Radio stations established in 1953
1953 establishments in Georgia (U.S. state)
Classic rock radio stations in the United States